Jan Joustra is the Vicar of St Marys, North  Melbourne in Melbourne, Australia. He was previously the Dean of Waikato in New Zealand from 2007 until 2011.

Joustra was born in the Netherlands before emigrating to Tasmania.  He was educated at the University of Tasmania. After working as a lecturer in textiles and design he was ordained in 1991.  He served curacies in East Melbourne and Wangaratta. After this he was Rector of Rutherglen-Chiltern. In 1997 he became priest in charge of St Stephen's, Hong Kong, a post he held until his appointment as the Anglican chaplain in Monaco. In 2007 he was appointed as Dean of Waikato. Since 2012 he has been Vicar of St Andrew's Church, Brighton.

References

Australian people of Dutch descent
University of Tasmania alumni
Deans of Waikato
Living people
Year of birth missing (living people)